A symbiotic eukaryote that lives in the stomach of termites, and other insects, Streblomastix is a protist that helps to digest wood along with other protists.

The Streblomastix engages in a relationship similar to that of bacteria endosymbionts of rumenous animals such as the cow.

Motility
The Streblomastix moves by beating its anterior flagella.

Morphology
This protozoan looks like a spade, with the stomach on the posterior, and the flagella on the anterior end.

These animals measure around 100 micrometers in length.

References
http://www.microscopy-uk.org.uk/mag/indexmag.html?http://www.microscopy-uk.org.uk/mag/artmar03/rhtermite.html
http://www.ucmp.berkeley.edu/protista/basalprotists.html

Metamonads